Snack vs. Chef is a television series on Netflix. The competition series sees contestants recreate snack foods, such as Oreos and Kit-Kats.

Episode list

See also
 List of Netflix original programming

References

External links 

 
 

2020s American reality television series
2022 American television series debuts
English-language Netflix original programming
Food reality television series